Mostafapur is a village in Chandpur district in the Chittagong division of Bangladesh.
Population 2,000 (present 2011). Number of houses in the village is sixteen.

The Member of Parliament is Rafiqul Islam who has represented the area since 2008.

GeoNameId: 1193875

References

Chandpur District